The Rangitoto Islands are a group of islands near the Marlborough Sounds along the northern coast of the South Island of New Zealand.

The group consists of Wakaterepapanui Island ( high), Tinui Island  ( high) and Puangiangi Island ( high).

From 1957 Puangiangi Island was inhabited solely by Ross Webber, who recently sold it.

See also

 Islands of New Zealand
 List of islands
 Desert island

References

Uninhabited islands of New Zealand
Islands of the Marlborough Sounds